Vincenza "Enza" Petrilli (born in Taurianova 28 August 1990) is an Italian paralympic archer who won a silver medal at the 2020 Summer Paralympics.

Achievements

References
3. "Triple gold for Vincenza Petrilli as world paras conclude in Dubai"

External links
 Vincenza Petrilli at Olympics.com
 Vincenza Petrilli at Worldarchery.sport

1990 births
Living people
Paralympic archers of Italy
Paralympic silver medalists for Italy
Paralympic medalists in archery
Archers at the 2020 Summer Paralympics
Medalists at the 2020 Summer Paralympics
Sportspeople from the Metropolitan City of Reggio Calabria